Théo Raymond (born 29 September 1991) is a retired French association footballer. He plays as a midfielder.

Career
At youth level, Raymond played for Toulouse FC B, the reserve team. In 2011, he was signed by S.League club Étoile FC for the 2011 S.League season, and made his debut in the 2 round, 0-0 game against Balestier Khalsa FC. In January 2014, he joined La Tamponnaise. He left the club in the summer 2014 when the club filed for bankruptcy.

In February 2016, Raymond joined French club AS Muret. In 2018 he stopped playing football and instead started playing rugby.

References

External links
 
 

Living people
1991 births
French footballers
French expatriate footballers
Singapore Premier League players
Ykkönen players
Championnat National 3 players
FC Jazz players
AS Excelsior players
Toulouse Fontaines Club players
FC Monthey players
Fanja SC players
Association football midfielders
French expatriate sportspeople in Singapore
French expatriate sportspeople in Finland
French expatriate sportspeople in Oman
Expatriate footballers in Singapore
Expatriate footballers in Finland
Expatriate footballers in Réunion
Expatriate footballers in Oman
Étoile FC players
Footballers from Toulouse